Alvito Rodrigues (born 2 July 1982) is an Indian footballer who plays for Salgaocar S.C. as a midfielder in I-League

External links
 http://goal.com/en-india/people/india/29801/alvito-rodrigues

Indian footballers
1982 births
Living people
Salgaocar FC players
I-League players
Association football midfielders
Footballers from Goa